As a major port, the Seattle Fire Department has maintained a fleet of fireboats in Seattle for over a century.

References

Seattle
Seattle Fire Department